S13 may refer to:

Aviation 
 Beriev S-13, an abandoned Soviet reconnaissance aircraft project
 Fokker S-13, a German trainer
 Letov Š-13, a Czechoslovakian fighter aircraft
 SIAI S.13, an Italian reconnaissance biplane
 Sikorsky S-13, a Russian aircraft design proposal
 SPAD S.XIII, a French biplane fighter

Automobiles 
 Nissan Silvia (S13), a Japanese sports car
 Nissan 240SX (S13), a sports car sold in North America

Rail and transit

Lines 
 S13 (Rhine-Ruhr S-Bahn), Germany
 S13 (ZVV), Zürich, Switzerland
 Line S13 (Milan suburban railway service), Italy

Locomotives 
 Sri Lanka Railways S13, a diesel multiple unit

Stations 
 Iyo-Izushi Station, in Ōzu, Ehime Prefecture, Japan
 Mizuho Undōjō Nishi Station, in Mizuho-ku, Nagoya, Aichi Prefecture, Japan
 Otaru-Chikkō Station, in Otaru, Hokkaido, Japan
 Sōgō Undō Kōen Station, in Suma-ku, Kobe, Hyōgo Prefecture, Japan
 Sumiyoshi Station (Tokyo), in Kōtō, Tokyo, Japan

Roads 
 S13 highway (Georgia)
 County Route S13 (California), United States

Science 
 40S ribosomal protein S13
 British NVC community S13, a swamps and tall-herb fens community in the British National Vegetation Classification system
 S13: Keep away from food, drink and animal feedingstuffs, a safety phrase
 S13, a star orbiting Sagittarius A*

Vessels 
 
 , an armed yacht of the Royal Canadian Navy
 , a submarine of the Royal Navy
 
 , a submarine of the United States Navy

Other uses 
 S13 (classification), a disability swimming classification
 S-13 rocket, a Soviet air-to-ground rocket weapon
 Shayetet 13, a unit of the Israel Defense Forces
 S13, a postcode district in Sheffield, England